Vârtopu may refer to several villages in Romania:

 Vârtopu, a village in Ciuperceni Commune, Gorj County
 Vârtopu, a village in the town of Corabia, Olt County